Let Him Go is a 2013 American neo-Western drama novel by Larry Watson. The book was released on September 3, 2013 through Milkweed Editions.

A film adaptation of the novel starring Diane Lane, Kevin Costner and Lesley Manville, and directed by Thomas Bezucha, was released on November 6, 2020 through Focus Features.

Film adaptation 
Focus Features released a film adaptation of the book on November 6, 2020, directed by Thomas Bezucha. The film stars Diane Lane, Kevin Costner and Lesley Manville.

See also 

 Let Him Go

References

External links 

 Official website

2013 American novels
American novels adapted into films
Novels set in Montana
Milkweed Editions books